Peki'in (alternatively Peqi'in) or Buqei'a , is a Druze–Arab town with local council status in Israel's Northern District. It is located eight kilometres east of Ma'alot-Tarshiha in the Upper Galilee. The majority of residents are Druze (78%), with a large Christian (20.8%) and Muslim (1.2%) minorities.

The former Jewish community of Peki'in maintained a presence there since the Second Temple period, with an interruption of presence during the 1936–1939 Arab revolt. Most Jews in Peki'in did not return to the village after the violence, and call themselves the Hadera [city] diaspora. It is believed that the Zinatis are the only family who returned, and this family has dwindled to one member.

History

Chalcolithic
Potsherds and ossuaries of the Chalcolithic period were found in the village, and a burial site close by, making a  settlement a possibility. 
The village Baca in Josephus' The Jewish War is thought to be Peki'in. According to Josephus it marked the border between the kingdom of Herod Agrippa II, and Tyre.

DNA findings
A 2018 study conducted by scholars from Tel-Aviv University, the Israel Antiquities Authority and Harvard University had discovered that 22 out of the 600 people who were buried in Peki'in cave from the Chalcolithic Period were of both local Levantine and Zagrosian ancestries, or as phrased in the paper itself: "Ancient DNA from Chalcolithic Israel reveals the role of population mixture in cultural transformation,” the scientists concluded that the homogeneous community found in the cave could source ~57% of its ancestry from groups related to those of the local Levant Neolithic, ~26% from groups related to those of the Anatolian Neolithic, and ~17% from groups related to those of the Iran Chalcolithic.". The scholars noted that the Zagros genetic material held "Certain characteristics, such as genetic mutations contributing to blue eye color, were not seen in the DNA test results of earlier Levantine human remains...The blue-eyed, fair-skinned community didn't continue, but at least now researchers have an idea why. "These findings suggest that the rise and fall of the Chalcolithic culture are probably due to demographic changes in the region".

We find that the individuals buried in Peqi’in Cave represent a relatively genetically homogenous population. This homogeneity is evident not only in the genome-wide analyses but also in the fact that most of the male individuals (nine out of ten) belong to the Y-chromosome Haplogroup T (Y-DNA)(see Supplementary Table 1), a lineage thought to have diversified in the Near East46. This finding contrasts with both earlier (Neolithic and Epipaleolithic) Levantine populations, which were dominated by Haplogroup E (Y-DNA), and later Bronze Age individuals, all of whom belonged to Haplogroup J (Y-DNA).

Identification with ancient Peki'in

A set of Jewish traditions is associated with a certain Peki'in, often appearing in writing under the names Baka, Paka and Peki'in, which gave rise to the theory that a Jewish community lived there continuously from the Second Temple period. According to the Talmud, Rabbi Joshua ben Hananiah ran a Beth Midrash, Rabbi Shimon bar Yochai and his son Rabbi Elazar ben Shimon, hid in a cave from the Romans for 13 years, and Shimon bar Yochai went on to teach at the city. However, there is evidence that the identification of Rabbinic Peki'in with Peki'in-Buqei'a is of Ottoman time, and other sites in the vicinity of Rehovot have also been suggested. The first writing where the name Peki'in undoubtedly refers to this village is from a 1765 Hebrew travel book.

Crusader and Mamluk periods
In the Crusader era, Peki'in was known under the name of  Bokehel. Together with several other villages in the area, it was part of the lordship of St. George, one of the largest in the Acre area. In the 12th century it was held by Henry de Milly, after his death it was inherited by his three daughters.

Henry de Milly's third and youngest daughter, Agnes of Milly, married Joscelin III. In 1220 their daughter Beatrix de Courtenay and her husband Otto von Botenlauben, Count of Henneberg, sold their land, including  "one third of the fief of St. George", and  "one third of the village of Bokehel", to the Teutonic Knights. During this era the village was connected by a road to Castellum Regis. 

The presence of a Druze community in the village in the early Mamluk period is attested by the geographer Shams al-Din al-Dimashqi (1257–1327).

Ottoman period

Incorporated into the Ottoman Empire in 1517 with the rest of Palestine, Peki'in appeared in the 1596 tax registers as being in the Nahiya of Akka of the Liwa of Safad. It had a population of 77 households and 7 bachelors who were all Muslims, in addition to 79 Jewish households. The villagers paid taxes on occasional revenues, goats and/or beehives, a press for olives or grapes, and jizya. A tax on silk spinning (dulab harir), which was levied in 1555 on six villages surrounding Mount Meron, rated highest in Peki'in. A silk industry is also attested by an account from 1602, and by several old mulberry trees in the village.

Jewish population was recorded at 33 households in 1525, and experienced a rise, drop, stabilization and another rise before 1596. It is said some Kohanitic families emigrated from Kafr 'Inan, possibly in the late 16th century. The Almani family probably came from the village Alma.

In 1875, French explorer Victor Guérin visited the village and described it as: "The population at present number 600—Druzes, United Greeks, Schismatic Greeks, and a few Jewish families, who descend from the ancient inhabitants of the country. Every year in the summer several hundreds of Jews come here from Tiberias to pass the hot season. Most of these Jews came originally from Europe, and are happy in finding here the last indigenous scions of the ancient national stock. ... At Bukeiah, thanks to the two springs which issue from the hill-side, they cultivate on the slopes and almost to the bottom of the valley delicious gardens, watered by numerous streams. Here grow, on different terraces, kept up by great walls, probably ancient, fruit-trees of all kinds, such as citrons, oranges, pomegranates, figs, quinces, and mulberries. The vine flourishes marvelously, as is shown by the enormous trunks. The United Greeks have a little church, which I found shut; the Schismatic Greeks also have one which has replaced a much more ancient Christian sanctuary. Only a few cut stones and the trunk of a column remain of it.The Jews worship in a synagogue of modern date."

In 1881, the Palestine Exploration Fund's Survey of Western Palestine described it as "A good village, built of stone, containing a chapel and a synagogue. There are about 100 Moslems, 100 Christians, 100 Druzes, and 100 Jews. It is situated on the slope of the hill, with gardens, figs, olives, pomegranates, and arable land. There is a good spring in the village, and two springs near. This is the only place where Jews cultivate the ground. They say it has descended to them from their fathers from time immemorial."

A population list from about 1887 showed  el Bukei’a to have about 950 inhabitants; Druse, Jews and Christians.

British Mandate period

In a census conducted in 1922 by the British Mandate authorities, Al Buqai'a had a population of 652 residents; 70 Muslims, 63 Jews, 215 Christians and 304 Druse. Of the Christians, 167 were Orthodox and 48 were Greek Catholic (Melchite). In the 1931 census, El Buqei'a had a total population of 799; 71 Muslims, 52 Jews, 264 Christians and 412 Druse, in a total of 190 houses.

In 1936, Arab riots forced the Jews of Peki'in to leave their homes for safer parts of the country; only a few of them later returned.

In the 1945 statistics, the population was 990; 100 Muslims, 370 Christians, and 520 "others", that is Druse, owning 10,276 dunams, while Jews owned 189 dunams, and 3,731 was publicly owned, according to an official land and population survey. Of this, 1,598 were allocated for plantations and irrigable land, 3,424 for cereals, while 40 dunams were classified as built-up areas.

State of Israel

In July 2006, Peki'in was hit by Katyusha rockets launched by Hezbollah, causing significant damage to homes and orchards.

In October 2007, riots broke out after the installation of a cellular antenna due to concerns that such antennas have been linked to an increase in cancer. Riot police fired bullets and gas grenades, which further angered the residents, who burned down the house of a Jewish family living in the village. In December 2007, the last Jewish family left the town after their car was torched. Only Margalit Zinati, a descendant of a Mustarabim family, has remained there to keep alive the memory of the town's vanishing Jewish heritage.

In 2011, the Israeli government approved an aid program of NIS 680 million ($184M) for housing, education and tourism upgrades in Peki'in and other Druze communities in northern Israel.

Education and culture

The Druze Youth Movement in Israel, a movement with 19 branches around the country and a membership of 12,000, has its headquarters in Peki'in. The founder of the movement is Hamad Amar, an Israeli Druze member of the Knesset from Shfaram, who established it to pass on Druze heritage to the younger generation while developing a sense of national Israeli pride.

Tourism

According to Galib Kheir, head of the town's tourism department, about 60,000 tourists visit Peki'in each year. The tourist trade supports local restaurants and specialty shops. The town also has a hotel and youth hostel.

See also
Arab localities in Israel
Peki'in Synagogue

References

Bibliography

External links
Welcome To Buqei'a/Peki'in
Survey of Western Palestine, Map 4: IAA, Wikimedia commons 
Map of Peqi'in 1947 - Eran Laor Cartographic Collection, The National Library of Israel 

Jews and Judaism in the Roman Empire
Arab localities in Israel
Arab Christian communities in Israel
Druze communities in Israel
Historic Jewish communities
Jewish pilgrimage sites
Local councils in Northern District (Israel)
Ancient Jewish settlements of Galilee